Vi vil skilles (We Want a Divorce) is a Norwegian comedy film from 1952 directed by Nils R. Müller. This was one of several "marriage comedies" in the 1950s and was a kind of sequel to Vi gifter oss (We're Getting Married), also directed by Müller. Arne Fjelberg, the priest at Uranienborg Church, played a priest in this film. The film starred Randi Kolstad and Espen Skjønberg.

Plot
Ola and Bitten get married after a very short courtship. They buy a house together, but the house is much more expensive than they can really afford. When Bitten's mother encourages Ola to buy more expensive furniture for their house, things get even worse, and the financial responsibility weighs on Ola. At the same time, Bitten neglects the housework, and her romantic ideas about marriage soon begin to crack. However, the couple soon has a son, Morten, who immediately becomes the sole focus in the family. Bitten assumes the parenting role so much that she completely forgets Ola.

Cast

 Randi Kolstad as Bitten Dahl
 Espen Skjønberg as Ola Berg
 Elisabeth Bang
 Finn Bernhoft as the mover
 Carl Hultman as the broker
 Gaselle Müller as Bente
 Morten Müller as Morten
 Lydia Opøien as Mrs. Dahl
 Paal Rocky as André
 Per Skift as Leif
 Kirsten Sørlie as Mrs. Skau

References

External links
 
 Vi vil skilles at Filmfront
 Vi vil skilles at the National Library of Norway

1952 films
Norwegian comedy films
Norwegian black-and-white films
1950s Norwegian-language films
Films directed by Nils R. Müller